The 2019 Teréga Open Pau–Pyrénées was a professional tennis tournament played on indoor hard courts. It was the first edition of the tournament which was part of the 2019 ATP Challenger Tour. It took place in Pau, France between 25 February and 3 March 2019.

Singles main-draw entrants

Seeds

 1 Rankings are as of 18 February 2019.

Other entrants
The following players received wildcards into the singles main draw:
  Mathias Bourgue
  Evan Furness
  Tristan Lamasine
  Lény Mitjana
  Alexandre Müller

The following players received entry into the singles main draw as alternates:
  Laurynas Grigelis
  Carlos Taberner
  Andrea Vavassori

The following players received entry into the singles main draw using their ITF World Tennis Ranking:
  Javier Barranco Cosano
  Raúl Brancaccio
  Peter Heller
  Roman Safiullin

The following players received entry from the qualifying draw:
  Steve Darcis
  Grégoire Jacq

Champions

Singles

 Alexander Bublik def.  Norbert Gombos 5–7, 6–3, 6–3.

Doubles

 Scott Clayton /  Adil Shamasdin def.  Sander Arends /  Tristan-Samuel Weissborn 7–6(7–4), 5–7, [10–8].

Teréga Open Pau-Pyrénées
2019 in French sport
February 2019 sports events in France
March 2019 sports events in France